The Pass of Brander is a mountain pass in the Highlands of Scotland, where the main railway and road to Oban makes its way between Cruachan, a 3,689 ft mountain, and Loch Awe.

A conventional turbine power station was created by damming the River Awe in the Pass of Brander, feeding the water through underground pipes, and generating electricity as it flows into Loch Etive.

It is notable for the Battle of the Pass of Brander, an important victory by Robert the Bruce, and the Pass of Brander stone signals on the railway line.

References

External links

Geography of Scotland